Gliese 317 is a small red dwarf star with two exoplanetary companions in the southern constellation of Pyxis. It is located at a distance of 49.6 light-years from the Sun based on parallax measurements, and is drifting further away with a radial velocity of +87.8 km/s. This star is too faint to be viewed with the naked eye, having an apparent visual magnitude of 11.98 and an absolute magnitude of 11.06.

This is an M-type main-sequence star with a stellar classification of M2.5V. Photometric calibrations and infrared spectroscopic measurements indicate that the star is enriched in heavy elements compared to the Sun. The star is estimated to be roughly five billion years old and has a low activity level for a star of its class. It has 42% of the mass and radius of the Sun and is spinning with a rotation period of 69 days. The star is radiating 2.2% of the Sun's luminosity from its photosphere at an effective temperature of 3,510 K.

Planetary system 

In 2007, a jovian planet (designated Gliese 317 b) was announced to orbit the star. The planet orbits about 95% the distance between Earth to the Sun.  Despite this, it takes about 1.9 years, due to the lower mass of the central M dwarf. Astrometric measurements on Gliese 317 provided a significant update to the distance, putting the star at 15.3 pc, which is 65% further out than previously assumed. Using mass-luminosity calibrations, the new distance implies the star is significantly more massive and so are the planet candidates. The same astrometric measurements allowed to constrain the orbital inclination and put an upper limit to the mass of Gliese 317 b (98% confidence level) of 2.5 .

The second planet in the system was also confirmed with the additional new RV measurements, but the period and orbital parameters of Gliese 317 c were very uncertain (P>2000 days). A stability analysis on this putative system suggest that the pair of gas giant planets are in a 4:1 mean motion resonance. The second planet, remote from its host star, is a good candidate for direct imaging. Revised elements of this companion were presented in 2020, demonstrating this is a Jupiter analog.

See also 

 Gliese 649
 Gliese 849
 HD 108874
 Lists of exoplanets

References

External links 

 
 Extrasolar Planet Interactions by Rory Barnes & Richard Greenberg, Lunar and Planetary Lab, University of Arizona

M-type main-sequence stars
Planetary systems with two confirmed planets
Pyxis (constellation)
0317